William George Watson (1 July 1918 – 4 November 1998) was a British weightlifter. He competed in the men's middleweight event at the 1948 Summer Olympics.

References

External links
 

1918 births
1998 deaths
British male weightlifters
Olympic weightlifters of Great Britain
Weightlifters at the 1948 Summer Olympics
20th-century British people